Observation is an act or instance of noticing or perceiving in the Natural sciences and the acquisition of information from a primary source. In living beings, observation employs the senses. In science, observation can also involve the perception and recording of data via the use of scientific instruments. The term may also refer to any data collected during the scientific activity. Observations can be qualitative, that is, only the absence or presence of a property is noted, or quantitative if a numerical value is attached to the observed phenomenon by counting or measuring.

Science
The scientific method requires observations of natural phenomena to formulate and test hypotheses. It consists of the following steps:
 Ask a question about a natural phenomenon
 Make observations of the phenomenon
 Formulate a hypothesis that tentatively answers the question
 Predict logical, observable consequences of the hypothesis that have not yet been investigated
 Test the hypothesis' predictions by an experiment, observational study, field study, or simulation
 Draw a conclusion from data gathered in the experiment, or revise the hypothesis or form a new one and repeat the process
 Write a descriptive method of observation and the results or conclusions reached
 Have peers with experience researching the same phenomenon evaluate the results

Observations play a role in the second and fifth steps of the scientific method. However, the need for reproducibility requires that observations by different observers can be comparable. Human sense impressions are subjective and qualitative, making them difficult to record or compare. The use of measurement was developed to allow recording and comparison of observations made at different times and places, by different people. The measurement consists of using observation to compare the phenomenon being observed to a standard unit. The standard unit can be an artifact, process, or definition which can be duplicated or shared by all observers.  In measurement, the number of standard units which is equal to the observation is counted.  Measurement reduces an observation to a number that can be recorded, and two observations which result in the same number are equal within the resolution of the process.

Human senses are limited and subject to errors in perception, such as optical illusions. Scientific instruments were developed to aid human abilities of observation, such as weighing scales, clocks, telescopes, microscopes, thermometers, cameras, and tape recorders, and also translate into perceptible form events that are unobservable by the senses, such as indicator dyes, voltmeters, spectrometers, infrared cameras, oscilloscopes, interferometers, Geiger counters, and radio receivers.

One problem encountered throughout scientific fields is that the observation may affect the process being observed, resulting in a different outcome than if the process was unobserved. This is called the observer effect. For example, it is not normally possible to check the air pressure in an automobile tire without letting out some of the air, thereby changing the pressure. However, in most fields of science, it is possible to reduce the effects of observation to insignificance by using better instruments.

Considered as a physical process itself, all forms of observation (human or instrumental) involve amplification and are thus thermodynamically irreversible processes, increasing entropy.

Paradoxes
In some specific fields of science, the results of observation differ depending on factors that are not important in everyday observation.  These are usually illustrated with apparent "paradoxes" in which an event appears different when observed from two different points of view, seeming to violate "common sense".
  Relativity: In relativistic physics which deals with velocities close to the speed of light, it is found that different observers may observe different values for the length, time rates, mass, and many other properties of an object, depending on the observer's velocity relative to the object. For example, in the twin paradox one twin goes on a trip near the speed of light and comes home younger than the twin who stayed at home.  This is not a paradox: time passes at a slower rate when measured from a frame moving concerning the object.  In relativistic physics, an observation must always be qualified by specifying the state of motion of the observer, its reference frame.
 Quantum mechanics: In quantum mechanics, which deals with the behavior of very small objects, it is not possible to observe a system without changing the system, and the "observer" must be considered part of the system being observed. In isolation, quantum objects are represented by a wave function which often exists in a superposition or mixture of different states. However, when an observation is made to determine the actual location or state of the object, it always finds the object in a single state, not a "mixture". The interaction of the observation process appears to "collapse" the wave function into a single state. So any interaction between an isolated wave function and the external world that results in this wave function collapse is called an observation or measurement, whether or not it is part of a deliberate observation process.

Biases
The human senses do not function like a video camcorder, impartially recording all observations.  Human perception occurs by a complex, unconscious process of abstraction, in which certain details of the incoming sense data are noticed and remembered, and the rest is forgotten.    What is kept and what is thrown away depends on an internal model or representation of the world, called by psychologists a schema, that is built up over our entire lives.  The data is fitted into this schema.  Later when events are remembered, memory gaps may even be filled by "plausible" data the mind makes up to fit the model; this is called reconstructive memory. How much attention the various perceived data are given depends on an internal value system, which judges how important it is to the individual. Thus two people can view the same event and come away with entirely different perceptions of it, even disagreeing about simple facts.  This is why eyewitness testimony is notoriously unreliable.

Several of the more important ways observations can be affected by human psychology are given below.

Confirmation bias

Human observations are biased toward confirming the observer's conscious and unconscious expectations and view of the world; we "see what we expect to see". In psychology, this is called confirmation bias.  Since the object of scientific research is the discovery of new phenomena, this bias can and has caused new discoveries to be overlooked; one example is the discovery of x-rays. It can also result in erroneous scientific support for widely held cultural myths, on the other hand, as in the scientific racism that supported ideas of racial superiority in the early 20th century. Correct scientific technique emphasizes careful recording of observations, separating experimental observations from the conclusions drawn from them, and techniques such as blind or double blind experiments, to minimize observational bias.

Processing bias
Modern scientific instruments can extensively process "observations" before they are presented to the human senses, and particularly with computerized instruments, there is sometimes a question as to where in the data processing chain "observing" ends and "drawing conclusions" begins. This has recently become an issue with digitally enhanced images published as experimental data in papers in scientific journals. The images are enhanced to bring out features that the researcher wants to emphasize, but this also has the effect of supporting the researcher's conclusions. This is a form of bias that is difficult to quantify. Some scientific journals have begun to set detailed standards for what types of image processing are allowed in research results. Computerized instruments often keep a copy of the "raw data" from sensors before processing, which is the ultimate defense against processing bias, and similarly, scientific standards require preservation of the original unenhanced "raw" versions of images used as research data.

Philosophy

Process philosophy is the observation of our senses and minds related to ourselves. Processed as hearing, sight, smell, taste, touch and thought.

For example, let us suppose that an observer sees a parent beat their child and consequently may observe that such an action is either good or bad. Deductions about what behaviors are good or bad may be based on preferences about building relationships, or the study of the consequences resulting from the observed behavior. Over time, impressions stored in the consciousness about many, together with the resulting relationships and consequences, permit the individual to build a construct about the moral implications of behavior.

See also

 Deixis
 Introspection
 List of cognitive biases
 Metaphysics of presence
 Naturalistic observation
 Observation unit
 Observational astronomy
 Observational error
 Observational learning
 Observational study
 Observable quantity
 Observations and Measurements
 Observatory
 Observer effect
 Noumenon
 Present
 Self
 Theory ladenness
 Uncertainty principle
 Unobservable

References

 
Aptitude
Cognition
Epistemology of science
Experiments
Knowledge
Perception
Philosophy of science
Scientific method
Sources of knowledge